Pararhodia is a genus of moths in the family Saturniidae first described by Theodore Dru Alison Cockerell in 1914.

Species
Pararhodia daviesorum Lemaire, 1979
Pararhodia gyra (W. Rothschild & Jordan, 1905)
Pararhodia meeki (Jordan, 1908)
Pararhodia rotalis U. Paukstadt, L. Paukstadt & Suhardjono, 1992
Pararhodia setekwa d`Abrera, 1998

References

Saturniinae